The  is a region situated on the southern part of the Kii Peninsula in Japan, former Muro District. It includes parts of Mie Prefecture, Wakayama Prefecture, and Nara Prefecture.

In 2004 it became a UNESCO designated World Heritage Site.

See also
 Kumano shrine
 Sacred Sites and Pilgrimage Routes in the Kii Mountain Range

Regions of Japan
Geography of Japan
World Heritage Sites in Japan
Geography of Mie Prefecture
Geography of Wakayama Prefecture
Geography of Nara Prefecture